"Mrzim spore stvari" (English translation: I hate slow things) is a pop song by the Croatian singer Ana Bebić, recorded for the Croatian selection for the Eurovision Song Contest 2009. It finished 12th in the national final with a total of 13 points.

HRT Dora 2009 
Ana Bebić one of the Croatian contestants for the musical talent show Operacija trijumf, qualified automatically for the finals of the Croatian national selection, HRT Dora, for the Eurovision Song Contest 2009. Bebić entered with this song, "Mrzim spore stvari". The final event of Dora 2009 was held on 29 February 2009, wherein sixteen contestants took part; Bebić performed first. Her songs received only two points from the jury and 11 points from the votes, and finished the 12th with a total of 13 points.

Composition 
"Mrzim spore stvari" was written by Croatian composers Mira Buljan and Nenad Ničević. Ninčević described the song as "different", "modern", "rebellious" and "totally western".

Chart positions

See also 
 Croatia in the Eurovision Song Contest
 Croatia in the Eurovision Song Contest 2009
 HRT Dora

References

External links 
 Dora 2009 Performance at YouTube
 Official Studio Version with Lyrics at YouTube
 Lyrics

2009 singles
Ana Bebić songs
2009 songs